KAOC (105.1 FM, "Maverick 105") is a radio station broadcasting a country music format. Licensed to Cavalier, North Dakota, it serves Langdon, North Dakota, Grafton, North Dakota, Morden, Manitoba, and Winkler, Manitoba. The station is currently owned by Simmons Broadcasting. All four Simmons Broadcasting stations share studios at 1403 Third Street in Langdon, ND. Canadian studios are at 467 Stephen Street in Morden, Manitoba.

External links
Maverick 105 official website

AOC
Country radio stations in the United States
Radio stations established in 1974
1974 establishments in North Dakota